Ambrosius Froben, or in Latin Frobenius (1537–1602), was a Basel printer, and publisher of an almost complete Hebrew Talmud, 1578–1580. He was son of Hieronymus Froben (1501–65), and grandson of Johann Froben (1460–1527) the Swiss scholar and printer.

References

Swiss book publishers (people)
1537 births
1602 deaths